Luquan may refer to the following places in China:

 Luquan District, Shijiazhuang, Hebei
 Luquan Yi and Miao Autonomous County, Kunming, Yunnan
 Luquan, Shandong (zh), town in and subdivision of Dongming County, Shandong